Dhuluʿiya is a town in Salah ad-Din Governorate, Iraq situated  on the left bank of the Tigris, near the mouth of the ʿAdhaim, some  east of Samarra and   north of Baghdad.
The population is predominantly Sunni Arab of the Jubur tribe.

History
Sa'ad Al-Izzi of The New York Times reported in 2003 that many people in the town had a negative attitude towards the American military occupation and a positive reception towards Saddam Hussein, opposing the U.S. invasion of Iraq. Sectarian violence between Sunnis and Shia occurred in 2004–2007. However, in 2009 Al-Izzi stated that the town was peaceful when he visited.

The town was partially taken by the Islamic State in Iraq and the Levant during their June 2014 offensive. In December 2014, it was retaken by tribal fighters, the Iraqi army, and the Popular Mobilization units in the Dhuluiya offensive.

References

Populated places in Saladin Governorate